Barbonymus belinka is a species of cyprinid fish that is endemic to the west coast of Sumatra. This species can reach a length of  TL.

References

belinka
Fish described in 1860